Shooting Star is the 1980 self-titled debut album by the group Shooting Star.  Shooting Star was the first American musical act signed by then upstart label Virgin Records.  Gus Dudgeon, mainly known for his work with Elton John, produced the album.  "You Got What I Need", "Bring It On", "Tonight", and "Last Chance" all received regular play on AOR radio stations.  The album peaked at number 147 on the Billboard 200 album charts. A reviewer for AllMusic called "Last Chance" one of the finest songs ever.

Track listing

Personnel
Van McLain – guitars, lead vocals
Gary West – lead vocals, guitars, keyboards
Bill Guffey – keyboards
Steve Thomas – drums
Ron Verlin – bass
Charles Waltz – violin, keyboards, vocals

References

1980 debut albums
Shooting Star (band) albums
Albums produced by Gus Dudgeon